Cullen Andrew Jones (born February 29, 1984) is an American former competition swimmer and Olympic gold medalist who specializes in freestyle sprint events.  As part of the American team, he holds the world record in the 4×100-meter freestyle relay (long course).  At the 2012 Summer Olympics, he won silver medals in the 4 x 100-meter freestyle relay and the 50-meter freestyle, as well as the gold in the 4 x 100-metre medley.

Childhood
Born on Leap day of 1984 in the Bronx borough of New York City, Jones moved to Irvington, New Jersey, while in elementary school. He learned to swim after he was rescued from a near-drowning at a splash-down pool at Dorney Park & Wildwater Kingdom in Pennsylvania when he was five years old.  He became an age-group swimmer at Metro Express, a club team at the Jewish Community Center in West Orange, New Jersey under head coach Ed Nessel.  Jones later switched teams to the Jersey Gators Swim Club in Cranford.
Jones graduated from Saint Benedict's Preparatory School in Newark in 2002. While there, he swam for coach Glenn Cassidy and set numerous Essex County swimming records.

Swimming career
Jones attended North Carolina State University, where he studied English and swam for the NC State Wolfpack swimming and diving team in the National Collegiate Athletic Association (NCAA) competition from 2003 to 2006.

2006
He turned professional in the summer of 2006, after signing with Nike and burst onto the scene shortly after at the 2006 Pan Pacific Swimming Championships where he set a meet record in the 50-meter freestyle with a time of 21.84 seconds.  He also swam a leg (split of 47.96) in the world record breaking 4×100-meter freestyle relay along with Michael Phelps, Neil Walker and Jason Lezak.

2007
In 2007, he also won a gold medal in 4×100-meter freestyle relay with the same teammates in the 2007 World Aquatics Championships.

2008 Summer Olympics

Jones is the first African-American to hold a world record (4×100-meter freestyle relay) in swimming. At the 2008 United States Olympic Trials, Jones broke the American record in the 50-meter freestyle with a time of 21.59.  The record was subsequently broken the next day by Garrett Weber-Gale.  At the 2008 Olympic Games in Beijing, China, he won a gold medal in the 4×100-meter freestyle relay in a world record time of 3:08.24 with Michael Phelps, Jason Lezak and Garrett Weber-Gale.

2009
In July 2009, Jones set the American record in the 50-meter freestyle at the U.S. National Championships in Indianapolis, Indiana.

2012

2012 US Olympic Trials
At the 2012 United States Olympic Trials in Omaha, Nebraska, the qualifying meet for the 2012 Olympics, Jones made the Olympic team for the second time by finishing first in the 50-meter freestyle and second in the 100-meter freestyle, which subsequently qualified him for the 4×100-meter freestyle relay.  In the 50-meter freestyle final, Jones won with a time of 21.59, one one-hundredth (0.01) of a second ahead of second-place finisher Anthony Ervin (21.60).

2012 Summer Olympics

At the 2012 Summer Olympics in London, Jones won silver medals in the 50-meter freestyle and the 4×100-meter freestyle relay. He earned a gold medal in the 4×100-meter medley relay after swimming the freestyle leg in the preliminaries. He also competed in the 100-meter freestyle, but did not qualify for the event finals.

The 2012 U.S. Olympic swim team was the first U.S. Olympic swim team with more than one black swimmer on it, Jones made history with Anthony Ervin and Lia Neal by being the three African-Americans on the team.

Personal bests (long course)

Key:  NR = National record

See also

 Diversity in swimming
List of Olympic medalists in swimming (men)
 List of United States records in swimming
 List of World Aquatics Championships medalists in swimming (men)
 List of world records in swimming
 World record progression 4 × 100 metres freestyle relay

References

External links
 
 
 
 
 
 
 Parting the Waters – Documentary film about Cullen Jones at DoTellProductions.com
https://olympics.com/en/athletes/cullen-jones

1984 births
Living people
African-American Christians
African-American sportsmen
American male freestyle swimmers
Baptists from New York (state)
Medalists at the FINA World Swimming Championships (25 m)
Medalists at the 2012 Summer Olympics
Medalists at the 2008 Summer Olympics
NC State Wolfpack men's swimmers
Olympic gold medalists for the United States in swimming
Olympic silver medalists for the United States in swimming
Pan American Games bronze medalists for the United States
Pan American Games medalists in swimming
People from Irvington, New Jersey
St. Benedict's Preparatory School alumni
Sportspeople from the Bronx
Swimmers at the 2008 Summer Olympics
Swimmers at the 2012 Summer Olympics
Swimmers at the 2015 Pan American Games
Universiade medalists in swimming
World Aquatics Championships medalists in swimming
World record holders in swimming
Universiade gold medalists for the United States
Medalists at the 2005 Summer Universiade
Medalists at the 2015 Pan American Games